Nicholas Rigby (1800 – 7 September 1886), was an English Catholic priest.

He was born in Walton-le-Dale near Preston, Lancashire. At the age of twelve he went to Ushaw College, where he was for a time professor of elocution. Ordained priest in September, 1826, he was sent to St. Mary's, Wycliffe, for six months, and was then given the united missions of Egton Bridge and Ugthorpe. After seven years the two missions were again separated, and he took up his residence at Ugthorpe. There he built a church (opened in 1855), started a new cemetery, and founded a middle-class college. About 1884 he resigned the mission work to his curate, the Rev. E.J. Hickey. He died at Ugthorpe. His obituary notice, in the Catholic Times of 17 September 1886, gives a sketch of his life.

Publications

The Real Doctrine of the Church on Scripture, to which is added an account of the conversion of the Duke of Brunswick (Anton Ulrich, 1710)
Father Ignatius Spencer (1830), (York, 1834), dedicated to the Rev. Benedict Rayment. 
Other works, chiefly treatises on primary truths, or sermons of a controversial character, are described in Joseph Gillow, Bibl. Dict. Eng. Cath.

References

Attribution

External links
 
 
 Father Rigby's The Real Doctrine of the Catholic Church on the Scripture

1800 births
1886 deaths
People from Walton-le-Dale
19th-century English Roman Catholic priests